The 2017 St. George Illawarra Dragons season was the 19th in the joint venture club's history. The Dragons competed in the NRL's 2017 Telstra Premiership season.

Gains And Losses of Squad

Players

Regular season

Season Results

Source:

Ladder progression

References

St. George Illawarra Dragons seasons
St. George Illawarra Dragons season